The Rugby Americas North Sevens is the rugby sevens competition for the confederation of North American and Caribbean rugby. It periodically serves as the regional qualifying competition for the World Cup Sevens and the Rugby sevens at the Olympics. In the early years of the competition the tier two teams from North America (Canada, United States) did not always participate or only sent representative sides outside of tournaments for World Cup qualification (2012) or Olympic qualification (2015).

Results

Results summary

See also
 Rugby Americas North Women's Sevens

Notes

References

External links 
 RAN official website

 
Rugby sevens competitions in North America
Rugby union competitions in the Caribbean